Vedat is a masculine given name meaning "friendship, love". It is commonly used in Turkey, and less commonly in Albania, North Macedonia and Kosovo. The name has one variant, "Vedad", a very common given name in Bosnia and Herzegovina. The name and more specifically its Arabic original name "Widad" is cognate with the Hebrew name "Medad" which also has the same meanings; love and friendship, coming from their shared Semitic origins.

Given name
 Vedat Aksoy (born 1988), Turkish para archer
 Vedat Buz, Turkish jurist
 Vedat Dalokay (1927–1991), Turkish politician and architect
 Vedat İnceefe, (born 1974), Turkish footballer
 Vedat Ademi, Albanian Kosovar singer-songwriter
 Vedat Kokona, Albanian  translator, writer and lexicologist
 Vedat Okyar, Turkish footballer
 Vedat Tek, Turkish architect
 Vedat Uysal, Turkish footballer
 Vedat Muriqi, Albanian footballer

References

Given names
Masculine given names
Turkish masculine given names
Albanian masculine given names